Chathura Randunu (born 1 April 1984) is a Sri Lankan first-class cricketer who plays for Bloomfield Cricket and Athletic Club.

In April 2018, he was named in Galle's squad for the 2018 Super Provincial One Day Tournament.

References

External links
 

1984 births
Living people
Sri Lankan cricketers
Bloomfield Cricket and Athletic Club cricketers
Cricketers from Colombo
Kandy Crusaders cricketers